("spoken singing") and  ("spoken voice") are expressionist vocal techniques between singing and speaking. Though sometimes used interchangeably, Sprechgesang is directly related to the operatic recitative manner of singing (in which pitches are sung, but the articulation is rapid and loose like speech), whereas Sprechstimme is closer to speech itself (because it does not emphasise any particular pitches).

Sprechgesang

Sprechgesang is more closely aligned with the long-used musical techniques of recitative or parlando than is Sprechstimme. Where the term is employed in this way, it is usually in the context of the late Romantic German operas or "music dramas" that were composed by Richard Wagner and others in the 19th century. Thus, Sprechgesang is often merely a German alternative to recitative.

Sprechstimme 

The earliest compositional use of the technique was in the first version of Engelbert Humperdinck's 1897 melodrama Königskinder (in the 1910 version it was replaced by conventional singing), where it may have been intended to imitate a style already in use by singers of lieder and popular song, but it is more closely associated with the composers of the Second Viennese School. Arnold Schoenberg asks for the technique in a number of pieces: the part of the Speaker in Gurre-Lieder (1911) is written in his notation for Sprechstimme, but it was Pierrot Lunaire (1912) where he used it throughout and left a note attempting to explain the technique. Alban Berg adopted the technique and asked for it in parts of his operas Wozzeck and Lulu.

History 

In the foreword to Pierrot Lunaire (1912), Schoenberg explains how his Sprechstimme should be achieved. He explains that the indicated rhythms should be adhered to, but that whereas in ordinary singing a constant pitch is maintained through a note, here the singer "immediately abandons it by falling or rising. The goal is certainly not at all a realistic, natural speech. On the contrary, the difference between ordinary speech and speech that collaborates in a musical form must be made plain. But it should not call singing to mind, either."

For the first performances of Pierrot Lunaire, Schoenberg was able to work directly with the vocalist and obtain exactly the result he desired, but later performances were problematic. Schoenberg had written many subsequent letters attempting to clarify, but he was unable to leave a definitive explanation and there has been much disagreement as to what was actually intended. Pierre Boulez would write, "the question arises whether it is actually possible to speak according to a notation devised for singing. This was the real problem at the root of all the controversies. Schoenberg's own remarks on the subject are not in fact clear."

Schoenberg would later use a notation without a traditional clef in the Ode to Napoleon Bonaparte (1942), A Survivor from Warsaw (1947) and his unfinished opera Moses und Aron, which eliminated any reference to a specific pitch, but retained the relative slides and articulations.

Sprechgesang style talk-singing has appeared in contemporary pop, rock, punk, and alternative music since the 1960s, with artists including Bob Dylan, Lou Reed, Jonathan Richman, The B-52's, The Fall, Nick Cave, Sonic Youth, They Might Be Giants, Slint, Cake, Life Without Buildings, The Hold Steady, French Vanilla, and Billie Eilish cited as acts that have used the technique. The sprechgesang vocal style is also prominent in the British post-punk scene of the 2020s, with groups such as Dry Cleaning, Black Country, New Road, and Squid featuring a vocalist that uses the talk-sing method.

Notation 
In Schoenberg's musical notation, Sprechstimme is usually indicated by small crosses through the stems of the notes, or with the note head itself being a small cross.

Schoenberg's later notation (first used in his Ode to Napoleon Bonaparte, 1942) replaced the 5-line staff with a single line having no clef. The note stems no longer bear the x, as it is now clear that no specific pitch is intended, and instead relative pitches are specified by placing the notes above or below the single line (sometimes on ledger lines). 

Berg notates several degrees of Sprechstimme, e. g. in Wozzeck, using single-line staff for rhythmic speaking, five-line staves with x through the note stem, and a single stroke through the stem for close-to-singing sprechstimme.

In modern usage, it is most common to indicate Sprechstimme by using an x in place of a conventional notehead.

See also 

 Parlando
 Rapping
 Spoken word
 Talking blues

References

External links 
 Avior Byron, ‘The Test Pressings of Schoenberg Conducting Pierrot lunaire: Sprechstimme Reconsidered’, Music Theory Online (MTO), 12/1 (February 2006)
 Avior Byron and Matthias Pasdzierny 'Sprechstimme Reconsidered Once Again: "... though Mrs. Stiedry is never in pitch"', Music Theory Online (MTO), 13/2 (June 2007)
 Avior Byron, 'Pierrot lunaire in studio and in broadcast: Sprechstimme, tempo and character', Journal of the Society of Musicology in Ireland (JSMI), 2 (2006–7)

Singing techniques
Extended techniques
Opera terminology
German words and phrases